Joseph Marcellin Rullière (born 1787, Saint-Didier-en-Velay – 1862, Paris) was a French politician.

Life
He was admitted to velites of the Old Guard in 1807, lieutenant in 1809.
He served during the Hundred Days. He was at the Siege of Antwerp in 1832 as a field marshal.
He was promoted Lieutenant General after the second expedition of Constantine, Algeria in 1837.
He was made Peer of France, in 1845.
He was Representative of the Loire to the Constituent Assembly of 1848 and the National Legislative Assembly in 1849.
He was a Deputy and Minister of the War Department in the Prince-President Napoleon III in 1848.

References

 

1787 births
1862 deaths
People from Haute-Loire
Politicians from Auvergne-Rhône-Alpes
Party of Order politicians
French Ministers of War
Members of the Chamber of Peers of the July Monarchy
Members of the 1848 Constituent Assembly
Members of the National Legislative Assembly of the French Second Republic
French generals
French military personnel of the Napoleonic Wars